Florida State Road 817 (SR 817) is a  state highway in the U.S. state of Florida, locally known as Northwest 27th Avenue (Unity Boulevard / Carrie P. Meek Boulevard) in Miami-Dade County and University Drive in Broward County. Its southern terminus is an intersection in Opa-locka with SR 9, which continues south along Northwest 27th Avenue to Dixie Highway (U.S. Route 1 (US 1) / SR 5) in the Coconut Grove neighborhood of Miami. Its northern terminus is at State Road 834 in Coral Springs, though the right of way continues north to Loxahatchee Road (County Road 827 or CR 827) at the Palm Beach County line.

Route description
SR 817 begins when Northwest 27th Avenue splits from its concurrency with State Road 9 in Opa-locka, and heads north, while SR 9 heads northeast towards the Golden Glades Interchange. The road passes through several neighborhoods, and has with two major intersections with the Palmetto Expressway and Miami Gardens Drive in Opa-locka and Miami Gardens, respectively. North of Miami Gardens Drive, SR 817 heads into one of the most congested zones in Miami Gardens, which includes access to Hard Rock Stadium, Calder Casino and Race Course, and an interchange with State Road 852 and the Turnpike that straddles the county line between Miami-Dade and Broward.

SR 817 enters Broward County and becomes University Drive after its intersection with SR 852. The road has no major intersections in Miramar. After its intersection with Pembroke Road on the border between Miramar and Pembroke Pines, University Drive forms the western border of North Perry Airport until its intersection with Pines Boulevard. After its intersection with Sheridan Street, SR 817 passes through what was formerly the Waldrep Dairy Farm until its intersection with Stirling Road. The road is sparsely littered with commercial businesses between its intersection with Stirling and Griffin Roads. North of Griffin, the road passes by Nova Southeastern University and the Central Campus of Broward College on its east side before its major intersections with State Road 84 and Interstate 595 (I-595) as it heads into Plantation.

North of I-595, SR 817 intersects with Broward Boulevard. Westfield Broward and Plantation Walk are located at this intersection. Afterwards, the road passes through mostly residential developments (which includes intersections with Sunrise Boulevard and Oakland Park Boulevard) in the cities of Sunrise and Lauderhill until its intersection with Commercial Boulevard. North of Commercial, the road continues about another three miles through Tamarac before its next major intersection with Atlantic Boulevard in Coral Springs. Coral Square is located at this intersection.

North of Atlantic Boulevard marks SR 817's final stretch into Coral Springs, with the final intersection at State Road 834 (Sample Road). University Drive continues north through an interchange with State Road 869 (Sawgrass Expressway) and a residential development in Parkland to terminate at an intersection with Loxahatchee Road on the Palm Beach County line.

Future
According to maps published by Fort Lauderdale-based Dolph Map Company, an extension of University Drive into Palm Beach County has been proposed. Under the proposal, the north–south highway will continue north past its terminus at Loxahatchee Road and connect to an intersection with Glades Road (a western extension of SR 808) and Palmetto Park Road (formerly SR 798). No indication has been given of what number designation this extension would have, or whether it would be a state or county road. However, the residents of western Boca Raton and Parkland have been fighting this extension for years, so it is unlikely.

Major intersections

References

External links

817
817
817